CGTN Spanish (formerly CCTV International Spanish or CCTV-Español and CCTV-E) is the Spanish language entertainment and news channel of China Global Television Network (CGTN), which is part of the state-owned broadcaster China Central Television (CCTV) originating in China, and is part of the Chinese Government's information ministry.

The channel caters to an international audience. All programs are dubbed into Spanish or they have Spanish subtitles. There are also news programs featuring Spanish-speaking reporters. These programs provide both Chinese and international news coverage.

Most programs on CGTN Spanish are 30 minutes long. They feature a variety of content, including news programs, educational programs, and Chinese soap operas.

There are also programs offering tourism advice and showcasing new Chinese artists.

CGTN Spanish was launched on October 1, 2007, as CCTV-E. It replaced the bi-lingual Spanish / French language CCTV E&F channel which was launched on October 1, 2004.

In 2016 CCTV-E partnered with TeleSUR to coproduce a cultural program called Prisma.

On 31 January 2022, CGTN French along with all channel was live telecast on CMG Spring Festival Gala 2022.

See also 
 CCTV-9, documentary
 CCTV-4 (International Chinese)
 CCTV-Русский (International Russian)
 CCTV-Français (International French)
 CCTV-العربية (International Arabic)
 CCTV-NEWS (International English)
 CNTV International

References

External links 
  

E
Spanish-language television stations
Spanish language in Asia
Television channels and stations established in 2007
Spanish-language television networks
2007 establishments in China